Aq Ziarat (also Romanized as Āq Zīārat; also known as Āghzīārat and Āgh Zīārat) is a village in Kenarporuzh Rural District, in the Central District of Salmas County, West Azerbaijan Province, Iran. At the 2006 census, its population was 534, in 115 families.

References 

Populated places in Salmas County